The 1993 FIA Touring Car Challenge was the first running of the FIA Touring Car World Cup. It was held on 17 October 1993 at the Autodromo Nazionale di Monza in Italy. Paul Radisich won the event after winning both races, while Italy was the winning nation.

Entry list

 Alain Menu was unable to compete for Switzerland due to injury. He would have driven a Renault 19. 
 Vaclav Bervid appeared on the entry list for the Czech Republic, but did not participate.
 Jean-Pierre Jabouille originally appeared on the entry list for France, but was replaced by Yannick Dalmas for an unknown reason.

Results

Drivers' standings

Nations' standings

 Each nation nominated up to 5 point-scoring drivers.

Points System

Points awarded to top 20 finishers as follows: 40-30-24-20-16-15-14-13-12-11-10-9-8-7-6-5-4-3-2-1.

References

Images from 'Motorsport Aktuell'
 http://img152.imageshack.us/f/1993monzaentryvj6.jpg/ 
 http://img524.imageshack.us/f/1993monzaqk5.jpg/

1993
1993 in motorsport
1993 in Italian motorsport